Christ Church Bardhaman is the oldest Church of undivided Bardhaman district. It is situated beside Grand Trunk Road in Bardhaman in the Indian state of West Bengal. The building was declared as heritage site by West Bengal Heritage Commission.

History

The Christ Church was established in 1816 by Church Missionary Society of Bengal. Captain Charles Stuart, an officer of East India Company arranged an annual grant of Rs 12.50 from a royal family to maintain the church. It was built with red brick in typical British Architecture.

References

External links
 

Churches in West Bengal
1816 establishments in India
British colonial architecture in India
Buildings and structures in Bardhaman
Tourist attractions in Purba Bardhaman district